Coumbassa is an African surname. Notable people with the surname include:

Mohamed Coumbassa (born 1995), Guinean football  midfielder
Saliou Coumbassa (1932–2003), Guinean politician and educator

Surnames of African origin